5:55 is the second album by French musician and actress Charlotte Gainsbourg. It was also her first album in twenty years. Charlotte collaborated on the album with French duo Air, English musician Jarvis Cocker, Irish singer-songwriter Neil Hannon, and Radiohead producer Nigel Godrich. "The Songs That We Sing" and "5:55" were released as singles. The album went platinum in France, selling over 500,000 copies. In the United States, the album sold 22,000 copies. "The Songs That We Sing" was No. 78 on Rolling Stones list of the 100 Best Songs of 2007.

Charlotte sang most of the album in English. In France, the album received critical acclaim. Pitchfork described its erotic lyrical content as reminiscent of Serge Gainsbourg's, and Charlotte's vocal approach as similar to that of Jane Birkin. Overall, the album received "generally favorable reviews" according to the review aggregator website Metacritic.

The first single, "The Songs That We Sing" was also included in the soundtrack to the 2009 film The Uninvited.

In 2012 it was awarded a platinum certification from the Independent Music Companies Association which indicated sales of at least 400,000 copies throughout Europe.

Track listing

Bonus tracks 
On some releases one or two bonus tracks were added.

Personnel
 Charlotte Gainsbourg – vocals
 Jean-Benoît Dunckel – piano, organ, synthesizer, glockenspiel, vibraphone, backing vocals, synth drums
 Nicolas Godin – acoustic guitar, electric guitar, 12-string guitar, bass, glockenspiel, synth drums, synthesizer, tambourine, melodica, percussion
 Jarvis Cocker – lyricist
 Neil Hannon – acoustic guitar
 Jeremy Stacey – drums
 Tony Allen – drums
 The Millennia Ensemble – strings
 David Richard Campbell – string arrangements, conductor
 Joby Talbot – string arrangements
Technical
 Nigel Godrich – production, mixing
 Bob Ludwig – mastering
 Dan Grech-Marguerat – engineering
 Darrell Thorp – engineering
 Florian Lagatta – engineering

Chart performance

Album

Singles
"The Songs That We Sing"

Release history

References

External links
 Charlotte Gainsbourg – official website.
 
 

Charlotte Gainsbourg albums
2006 albums
Albums arranged by David Campbell (composer)
Albums produced by Nigel Godrich